Adewusi is a Nigerian surname. Notable people with the surname include:

Shola Adewusi (born 1963), British actress of stage, screen, and radio
Sunday Adewusi (1936–2016), Nigerian policeman and Inspector General of Police

Surnames of Nigerian origin